Sobha Singh may refer to:
 Sobha Singh (builder), builder of Delhi
 Sobha Singh (painter)
 Sobha Singh (Sikh chieftain), one of the triumvirate rulers of Lahore during the late 18th century